Richtenberg is a municipality in the Vorpommern-Rügen district, in Mecklenburg-Western Pomerania, Germany.

Richtenberg was first mentioned in the founding document of the Neuenkamp monastery (today Franzburg) dated 8 November 1231. It is the oldest documented place in the region. In the foundation deed of the ruling Prince Wizlaw I, the monastery was awarded a patronage over the Richtenberg church as well as a local salt source.

References

Populated places established in the 13th century
1290s establishments in the Holy Roman Empire
1297 establishments in Europe